Energising India (2004) is a short documentary on how India can have energy without polluting the atmosphere. Although about India, this is a German film (since the producers are German, GTZ) and directed by the National Award winning Indian director Jyoti Sarup. This film was premiered in the World Energy Conservation Conference, Germany, in 2004.

Summary
The film showcases methods of industrialisation through the case study of three of the top companies of India- INDAL Aluminium (Birla Group), Reliance Petro-Chemical (Reliance Group) and Raymond (Raymond Group).

The film highlights the point that these companies have pollution below 1% and then shows the methods/techniques adopted by them.

Trivia
The film started off by showcasing only one company. But when the film was shown to Mr. Sahi, the Secretary, dept. of Energy Conservation, Govt. of India he appreciated the film and efforts and the final result and asked the producers to give the film a wider perspective by adding to more companies of different sectors in the film.

See also
Solar power in India

External links

2004 films
Environment of India
Documentary films about energy
Documentary films about India
German documentary films
2000s German films